Kamil Mikulčík (born November 18, 1977) is a Slovak singer and actor who was the represented Slovakia at the Eurovision Song Contest 2009 with Nela Pocisková. They failed to reach the final.

Personal life
In 2009, Mikulčík married Czech Lion-nominee actress Kristína Farkašová, whom he divorced the following year (2010).

Filmography

See also
 The 100 Greatest Slovak Albums of All Time

References

1977 births
Living people
Eurovision Song Contest entrants of 2009
Eurovision Song Contest entrants for Slovakia
21st-century Slovak male singers